Nothing Less is an album by Krezip that debuted at #1 in both the Netherlands and Belgium.

Track list
All songs written by Jacqueline Govaert except where noted.
"All Unsaid" (Govaert/Van Haaren) - 3:07
"Won't Cry" - 3:14
"Give My Life" - 3:27
"I Would Stay" - 3:50
"Protection" - 2:46
"Why Do I" - 3:59
"Thought That You Would Be" - 2:42
"Get It On" - 3:55
"Everything and More" - 4:05
"Happy Now" - 3:39
"I'll Be Gone" - 2:42
"Let It Go" - 3:03
"Fine" - 4:20

Personnel
 Jacqueline Govaert - vocals, piano
 Anne Govaert - guitar
 Joost van Haaren - bass guitar
 Annelies Kuijsters - guitar, backing vocals
 Thijs Romeijn - drums
 Oscar Holleman - production

Charts

Weekly charts

Year-end charts

References

Krezip albums
2000 albums